Trachinotinae is a subfamily of the family Carangidae, the jacks and pompanos.

Genera
Two genera are placed in the Trachinotinae:

 Lichia Cuvier, 1816
 Trachinotus Lacepède, 1801

References

 
Carangidae